The St. Helena Seamount chain, also known as the St. Helena Seamounts, is an underwater chain of seamounts in the southern Atlantic Ocean. The chain has been formed by the movement of the African Plate over the Saint Helena hotspot.

References

Geography of Saint Helena
Seamount chains
Seamounts of the Atlantic Ocean
Geology of Saint Helena, Ascension and Tristan da Cunha
.